"Loverboy" is Billy Ocean's second single from his 1984 album, Suddenly. It was produced by Keith Diamond and reached number 2 on the U.S. Billboard Hot 100 as well as hitting number 20 on the soul chart, and number 15 on the UK Singles Chart in February 1985. It also reached the top spot of the Hot Dance Music/Club Play chart in the U.S., in an extended version. The track was released on the Jive label under the catalogue reference, JIVE 80. The song was played in the first episode of the long-running BBC One medical drama Casualty on 6 September 1986.

The single was also a massive success in South Africa, reaching No. 1 on the Springbok Charts, remaining in that position for 11 of the 26 weeks it charted. It was also the No. 1 single of 1985 on that country's year-end charts.

Music video
The sci-fi-themed music video was directed by Maurice Phillips and it was shot at Durdle Door in Dorset, England, and features an alien rider on horseback riding up the coast to a bar built inside a cave. He tries to attract the attention of a female alien inside the cave, and after he shoots her partner with a laser, they ride off on the horse together at the end. The video is interspersed with scenes of Ocean (appearing in a pyramid hologram) performing the song.

Track listings

7": Jive / JS1-9284 (US) JIVE 80 (UK)
 "Loverboy" - 3:58	
 "Loverboy" (Dub Mix) - 4:59

12": Jive / JD1-9280 (US)
 "Loverboy" (Extended Club Remix) - 8:08			
 "Loverboy" (Single Version) - 4:12
 "Loverboy" (Dub Mix) - 4:59

12": Jive / JIVE T 80 (UK - Limited Edition)
 "Loverboy" (Extended Club Remix) - 8:08			
  "Nights (Feel Like Getting Down)" 
 "Loverboy" (Dub Mix) - 4:59

Charts

Weekly charts

Year-end charts

Notable appearances in other media

 The song was ranked by the "80 of the 80s" podcast as #38 of the decade.

Boystar version

In 2002, Australian group "Boystar", consisting of Ian Starr, Decklyn Jaxx and Steven Childs, released a cover version of "Loverboy". It was their first and only release. it debuted at peaked at #12 on the ARIA singles chart.

Track listing
"Loverboy" was released on a 5-track CD single
"Loverboy" (Radio Edit) (3:37)
"This Ain't Love" (3:06)
"Loverboy" (Diego V Euro Club) (5:21)
"Loverboy" (DJ Nikko Dirty Club) (4:14)
"Loverboy" (Diego V RNB) (4:30)

Charts

References

1984 songs
1985 singles
2002 singles
Billy Ocean songs
Songs written by Robert John "Mutt" Lange
Song recordings produced by Robert John "Mutt" Lange
Songs written by Keith Diamond (songwriter)
Songs written by Billy Ocean
Jive Records singles